The Unconditional Union Party was a loosely organized political entity during the American Civil War and the early days of Reconstruction. First established in 1861 in Missouri, where secession talk was strong, the party fully supported the preservation of the Union at all costs. Unlike the similarly named Unionist Party, which operated throughout the North, the Unconditional Unionist Party only operated in the border states. Members included Southern Democrats who were loyal to the Union as well as elements of the old Whig Party and other factions opposed to the separate Southern Confederacy. The party was dissolved in 1866.

Missouri's Unconditional Union Party
Following the splintered presidential election of 1860, it became apparent that much of the South would not abide by the election of Abraham Lincoln. In Missouri, Francis P. Blair Jr. began consolidating that state's adherents of Lincoln, John Bell, and Stephen A. Douglas into a new political party, the Unconditional Union Party, which would lay aside antebellum partisan interests in favor of a single cause, the preservation of the Union. Blair and his supporters' primary goal was "to resist the intrigues of the Secessionists, by political action preferably, by force if need were."

Another faction in Missouri also supported restoration of the Union, but with conditions and reservations, including granting the extension of slavery westward. Others believed that once the Southern states should be allowed to leave the Union peaceably, as they would soon realize their mistake and petition for restoration to the Union. Blair worked to form an alliance with these so-called "Conditional Unionists" to bolster his numbers.

The first formal convention of the Missouri Unconditional Union Party was held February 28, 1861, in St. Louis. No avowed secessionists were invited; only those political leaders who had openly supported Bell, Lincoln, or Douglas were allowed to participate. The delegates passed a series of resolutions including formally declaring "at present there is no adequate cause to impel Missouri to dissolve her connection with the Federal Union,"  As a compromise to the Conditional Unionists, the convention also entreated "the Federal government as the seceding States to withhold and stay the arm of military power, and on no pretense whatever bring upon the nation the horrors of civil war."

Missouri's secessionists failed to garner enough statewide support to dissolve the Union, so they, under the leadership of Governor Claiborne F. Jackson, broke away and formed a separatist government and eventually took up arms against the Union Army. Pro-Union politicians consolidated their control over Missouri politics as the war progressed and Jackson and his pro-Confederacy Missouri State Guard were forced out of the state. Unconditional Unionist Benjamin Franklin Loan was elected to the 38th United States Congress.

The Unconditional Union Party in other border states

Similar efforts to Blair's sprang up in other states south of the Mason–Dixon line where the populations and political leaders were split in their loyalty to the Union. In Kentucky, the Unconditional Union Party emerged as a counter to the pro-secession views of several of the state's more outspoken leaders.

A similar movement was underway in Maryland, where its leaders also advocated the immediate emancipation of all slaves in the state without compensation to the slave owners. With the help of the Federal government and its troops, Maryland's secessionist voices were stilled. The party was not formalized until the summer of 1863 when adherents worked to elect pro-Union candidates at the state and local level, particularly in Western Maryland. Because Lincoln's Emancipation Proclamation only applied to slaves in those states in rebellion, and did not include border states such as Maryland, the party shifted its emphasis to the question of freeing slaves locally. The Conservative Union State Central Committee, led by Thomas Swann and John P. Kennedy, met in Baltimore on December 16, 1863. It passed a resolution supporting immediate emancipation "in the manner easiest for master and slave." Supporters included the local military commander, Robert C. Schenck. When the Federal government failed to respond, the Unconditional Union policy held a second similar meeting on April 6, 1864, and again overwhelmingly supported immediate emancipation. General Schenk's replacement, Lew Wallace, supported the resolution.

Henry Winter Davis was elected to represent  in the 38th Congress (1863–65) on the Unconditional Unionist ticket. He was among Lincoln's harshest critics, believing that the president's stated policy for Southern reconstruction was too lenient. In 1864, after Lincoln vetoed reconstruction legislation sponsored by Davis and Senator Benjamin Wade, he and Wade published the "Wade-Davis Manifesto" openly attacking the president. As a result, Davis was not renominated for another term.

References

 Harding, Samuel B. (1904). Life of George R. Smith, Founder of Sedalia, Mo.. Sedalia, Missouri: Privately printed.
 Nevins, Allan (1971). The War for the Union: The Organized War to Victory 1864-1865. Scribner Book Company.
 Willoughby, William F. (1901). State Activities in Relation to Labor in the United States. Johns Hopkins University Studies in Historical and Political Science'', Vol. XIX. Baltimore: Johns Hopkins Press.

Defunct political parties in the United States
Missouri in the American Civil War
Kentucky in the American Civil War
Maryland in the American Civil War
Politics of Missouri
Politics of Kentucky
Political parties in Maryland
American Civil War political groups
Political parties established in 1861
Unionist Party (United States)
1861 establishments in the United States
Political parties with year of disestablishment missing
Political parties disestablished in 1866
1866 disestablishments in the United States
Political parties in the United States